Market Square Tower is a residential high rise in downtown Houston, Texas, USA. The building began construction in 2014 and was completed in early 2017. At the time of groundbreaking, the building was the largest residential building in downtown in number of units and floors. The building is noted for a glass bottom pool that protrudes from the side of the building near the top, known as the Sky Pool.

See also
List of tallest buildings in Houston

References

Residential skyscrapers in Houston
Residential buildings completed in 2017
2017 establishments in Texas